The Maryland School of Public Policy is one of 14 schools at the University of Maryland, College Park. The school is located inside the Capital Beltway and ranks 16th nationally for schools of public policy according to U.S. News & World Report (2012).

History
 On October 26, 1978, University of Maryland President John S. Toll appointed the Committee on a School of Public Affairs to pursue the question of whether the College Park campus should establish a new school. With the support of the Sloan foundation and key individuals such as U.S. Senator Joseph Tydings and publisher Philip Merrill, the Maryland School of Public Affairs was established on the campus of the University of Maryland, College Park in 1981. By April 1981, Albert Bowker was appointed the first dean of the school and a group of faculty was recruited. The first seven faculty included Allen Schick, Robert Pastor, Catherine Kelleher, Frank Levy, Peyton Young, George Eads and Mark Winer. The school's doors opened in 1982 and degrees were conferred on a dozen students during the school's first graduation exercises in 1984.

The School of Public Affairs changed its name to the School of Public Policy in 2004 in order to better communicate its mission to contribute to the nation and the world through the preparation of current and future leaders committed to public service.

The School of Public Policy expanded to offer an undergraduate program in the Spring of 2017 aimed at developing skills necessary to have a positive impact on the global community.

The school is a full member of the Association of Professional Schools of International Affairs (APSIA), a group of schools of public policy, public administration, and international studies.

Master's degree programs
The school enrolls close to 500 graduate students and offers full-time and part-time Master of Public Policy (MPP) and Master of Public Management (MPM) degrees, as well as a Ph.D. in Policy Studies.

Master of Public Policy
The UMD School of Public Policy's MPP program helps students become equipped to succeed in the policy management field and become effective public policy leaders. Graduates are adept at analyzing, designing, evaluating, and advocating for public policies.

Master of Public Management
The school offers the MPM program in two tracks for students who have at least five or more years of professional policy or management-related experience after their undergraduate studies. The 36-credit, policy-oriented curriculum tracks the MPP curriculum with 12 fewer elective credits. The Executive Master of Public Management (EXPM) follows a prescribed 30-credit, management-oriented curriculum. Many EXPM students attend evening classes twice a week in Washington, D.C. Students move through the program as a cohort and have the opportunity to participate in numerous enrichment activities.

Joint Master's Programs (MPP/MBA, MPP/MS, and MPP/JD)
The school has also established joint degree programs with the University of Maryland's A. James Clark School of Engineering, the College of Computer, Mathematical, and Natural Sciences Conservation Biology program, the Robert H. Smith School of Business, and the University of Maryland School of Law in Baltimore.

Specializations
Students pursuing master's degrees can choose to specialize in the following areas:

 Education policy
The education policy specialization allows students to focus on policies and politics of education reform and the economics of education. Students in this specialization also study the foundations of social policy, program evaluation, and cost-benefit analysis
 Environmental policy
The environmental policy specialization aims to train students to find effective solutions to promote sustainable social, economic and environmental conditions. Students learn to encourage human well-being and economic prosperity while also enhancing the health and quality of the environment. Students have the opportunity to engage in real and relevant research and investigate scientific, philosophical, legal, economic, and political dimensions of environmental issues.
Energy policy
The energy specialization focuses on current and future energy systems and how they interact with policy and society. Four dimensions of energy policy are analyzed and studied, including economic well-being, energy security, environmental protection and energy access. 
Federal acquisition
The federal acquisition specialization prepares students to deliver acquisition outcomes to support a variety of areas including military operations, homeland security, health care, responses to natural disasters, and energy research and development. The experience gained in this specialization is useful to students interested in federal, local and state government. Students also have the opportunity to conduct research and participate in acquisition-related activities in the School's Center for Public Policy and Private Enterprise.
 Health policy
The health policy specialization teaches students the basics of social policy, along with program evaluation and analysis of costs and benefits of social programs. In addition, students in this specialization study health policy; health economics; and disease, disasters and development related to health policy.
 International development
The international development policy places focus on economics, political, demographic, health, and ethical dimensions of development. Topics covered include economic stagnation, poverty, unhappiness, food insecurity, political repression, ethnic/religious conflict, population displacement, and health. Students obtain the tools and skills to identify development challenges and to measure the effects of interventions on development outcomes. 
International security and economic policy
The international security and economic policy specialization allows students to address 21st century challenges in security and economic policy including international financial crises and trade conflicts, as well as conflicts involving terrorism and destructive technology. The program also focuses on addressing the gap between the need for international management of these issues and the state of current international institutions. 
 Management and leadership
The management and leadership specialization prepares students for future leadership and management at the local, state and federal level. Students study financial mechanisms; management and leadership theories and practices; and learn how government can work with the private and nonprofit sectors.
 Nonprofit management and leadership
The nonprofit management and leadership specialization allows students to study financial management for nonprofit organizations, strategic management, strategic philanthropy, social entrepreneurship, and theory of nonprofit fundraising. 
 Public sector financial management
The public sector financial management specialization prepares students to handle state and local government budgeting, federal budgeting, financial systems control, and analyzing fiscal conditions.
 Social policy
The social policy specialization provides students with the knowledge of relevant history and institutions of social policy, helps students develop their quantitative skills for program evaluation and analysis of large data sets, and helps them handle moral issues raised by inequality.

Research centers
The centers and institutes located within the Maryland School of Public Policy offer students opportunities to work on research projects with practitioners who make significant contributions to global and domestic policy. The research, educational and service centers at Maryland include:

 Center for International and Security Studies at Maryland (CISSM)
The Center for International and Security Studies at Maryland (CISSM) conducts research, informs policy debates, and helps current and future leaders find creative solutions to complex global challenges. Three cross-cutting themes connect faculty, researchers, and students working on CISSM’s research agenda: Reducing risks from dual-use technologies, enhancing human security, and improving multi-stakeholder governance.
Center for Global Sustainability (CGS)
The Center for Global Sustainability (CGS) utilizes a collaborative, interdisciplinary approach to deliver research, education, and engagement for policy impact. Through analysis for ambition and collaborative action, CGS is helping drive the global engine of ambition critical to meet goals related to climate, development, and sustainability by integrating field-leading research, applied assessment, and policy analysis; and implementing it through partnerships and engagement at all scales.
 Center for Governance of Technology and Systems (GoTech) 
The Center for Governance of Technology and Systems (GoTech) builds an expansive community of educators, researchers, private practitioners, and policy makers to explore the development, governance, and sustainment of complex critical infrastructure technologies and networks through rigorous interdisciplinary research; help advance a holistic approaches to governance through effective engagement between the public and private sector; and develop interdisciplinary educational programs.
 Civic Innovation Center 
The Civic Innovation Center launched in the aftermath of the most consequential election in generations with the commitment to tackle United States' democracy’s big challenges and to sustain the incredible energy of the greatest voter turnout in a century.
 Do Good Institute
The Do Good Institute believes that all students are capable of creating effective change, making a powerful impact and innovating creative solutions to our world’s most pressing challenges, now. The Institute equips students with the skills, experiences and resources that result in a lifelong commitment to social impact. The Do Good Institute is known for the Do Good Challenge, in which students spend the year advocating, fundraising, volunteering, and developing solutions for pressing social issues. The Challenge culminates in a Finals event where six teams pitch their project or venture and the impact they've made for the chance to win a share of more than $20,000.
 National Center for Smart Growth
The center is a non-partisan center for research and leadership training on Smart Growth and related national and international land-use issues.

Selected faculty
Apfel, Kenneth S., former commissioner of the U.S. Social Security Administration.
Besharov, Douglas, senior conservative scholar at the American Enterprise Institute, former director of the U.S. National Center on Child Abuse and Neglect, and expert on welfare reform.
Bhargava, Alok, econometrician working on issues of food policies and population health in developing and developed countries.
Daly, Herman, pioneer in the field of ecological economics and steady-state theory, senior economist in the Environment Department of the World Bank.
Destler, I. M. (Mac), fellow at the Peterson Institute for International Economics and authority on U.S. trade policy.
Duke, Elizabeth (Betty), former Career Federal Senior Executive in charge of programs to improve the business processes and human resources of the Food and Drug Administration and the U.S. Department of Health and Human Services.
Fetter, Steve, former dean of the school and assistant director (at-large) in the White House Office of Science and Technology Policy.
Foreman, Christopher, non-resident senior fellow in Governance Studies at the Brookings Institution, senior fellow at the Breakthrough Institute, and expert on environmental justice and the national politics of health and safety regulation.
Gallagher, Nancy, associate director for Research at the Center for International and Security Studies at Maryland (CISSM) and former executive director of the Clinton administration's Comprehensive Nuclear Test Ban Treaty Organization Task Force.
Galston, William, former domestic policy advisor to Bill Clinton and senior fellow at the Brookings Institution
Gansler, Jacques, former U.S. Under Secretary of Defense for Acquisition, Technology and Logistics.
Graham, Carol, senior fellow at the Brookings Institution and specialist in international development
Grimm, Jr., Robert, first professor and director of a philanthropy and nonprofit management program, former director of the Center for Philanthropy and Nonprofit Leadership and former director of research and policy development at the Corporation for National and Community Service (CNCS).
Hultman, Nathan, deputy associate director for energy and climate change in the White House Council on Environmental Quality, nonresident fellow at the Brookings Institution specializing in the global economy and development, and associate director of the Joint Global Change Research Institute, Pacific Northwest National Laboratory
Reuter, Peter, founder and former director of the Drug Policy Research Center at the RAND Corporation
Schelling, Thomas, pioneer in game theory and winner of the 2005 Nobel Prize in Economics.
Schick, Allen, fellow at the Brookings Institution and widely recognized authority on the federal budget.
Schwab, Susan, former U.S. Trade Representative, former president and CEO of the University System of Maryland Foundation, and former dean of the UMD School of Public Policy.
Steinbruner, John, widely recognized authority on arms control, nuclear weapons, and Russian foreign policy.
Swagel, Phillip L., former Assistant Secretary of the Treasury for Economic Policy, chief of staff and a senior economist at the White House Council of Economic Advisers, and economist at the International Monetary Fund and the Federal Reserve Board.

References

External links
School of Public Policy

School of Public Policy
Public policy schools
Public administration schools in the United States
School of Public Policy
Educational institutions established in 1981